The American media franchise, The X-Files, created by Chris Carter uses inspirations and sources from other fictional media as well as many real-life paranormal cases that have been alleged/documented, though not necessarily proven to be true. The show's creator Chris Carter stated: Many of our ideas spring from actual accounts, essays, pieces in journals that we expand by posting "what if".

Fictional inspirations

Film
The X-Files also borrows themes and settings, both major or minor, from popular movies during or around the same time era that covered the same or similar topics of the paranormal, government conspiracy, and alien contact. The X-Files pilot episode's ending draws inspiration from Raiders of the Lost Ark, which shows the government archiving top secret items and documents kept away from the public. The show's early episodes borrow elements from various films including Close Encounters of the Third Kind, JFK, and The Night Strangler. Amongst other films that the shows first season episodes borrow from are It, based on the popular horror novel of the same name by Stephen King. Additional inspirational films include Poltergeist (1982), Ghostbusters (1984), 2001: A Space Odyssey (1968), Die Hard (1988), Star Trek II: The Wrath of Khan (1982), The Thing (1982), Predator (1987), Moonraker (1979), The Entity (1982), Cocoon (1985), The Serpent and the Rainbow (1988), the Terminator films (1984), Project A (1983), Congo (1995), The Exorcist (1973), and The Omen (1976). These are among many other films that the series borrows from or includes themes and settings from them.

Television
The show's darker tones and settings also borrows from other TV shows with similar themes and settings. The concept of the show borrows from another TV series Twin Peaks. The inspiration for one of the main characters Dana Scully and her role at the FBI borrows from The Silence of the Lambs. Her relationship to Fox Mulder draws elements from the 1960s TV series The Avengers.

Alongside many real-life documented cases dealing with the concepts of alien abduction, alien invasion and UFOs, The X-Files franchise also borrows these same themes from other TV shows that have also covered the subject. Such shows go back to the 1950s, '60s and '70s when such topics were popular and massively discussed in the American media. Television series of those times such as The Quatermass Experiment from the 1950s, The Invaders from the 1960s, Kolchak: The Night Stalker from the 1970s, V: The Final Battle from the 1980s all served as inspirations.

Non-fictional inspirations
Prior to conceiving The X-Files in 1993, Chris Carter traveled the world writing for Surfer and read a report claiming that some 3.7 million Americans may have been abducted by aliens. While the American Federal Bureau of Investigation (FBI) does not have a branch that investigates paranormal cases as seen in The X-Files universe, the organization was involved in assisting the United States Army and the United States Air Force (USAF) investigate UFO sightings going back to the 1950s when the phenomenon first became popular.

Episodes directly inspired by true cases
The episode from the third season of the show, "Jose Chung's From Outer Space", draws inspirations from real-life alien abduction cases, including that of Barney and Betty Hill and also includes the use of hypnosis to revive the memories of these alleged abductions.

References

External links
U.Md. professor provides the science behind ‘The X-Files’

Sources and analogues
X Files